Touchstones Rochdale is an art gallery, museum, local studies centre, visitor information centre and café forming part of the Central Library, Museum and Art Gallery in Rochdale, Greater Manchester, England. It is a Grade II listed building.

The first part of the stone building was opened as a library in 1884 with the museum and gallery being added in 1903 and extended in 1913. It became an art and heritage centre in 2003. It houses collections relating to local history and related topics, with changing exhibitions over time.

History

The library was built first, opening in 1884, after a fire at Rochdale Town Hall destroyed the "Clock Tower Library" in 1883. The art gallery and museum were built and linked to the library in 1903, and an extension added in 1913.  The building was converted into an art and heritage centre in 2003.

Collections

The museums has collections relating to: social history, costume and textiles, archaeology, Egyptology, geology, natural history and decorative arts. There is a particular focus on the American Civil War and its impact on the cotton industry during the Lancashire Cotton Famine of the 1860s. The collection is accredited by Arts Council England. It also hosts changing exhibitions.

Architecture

It is in Yorkshire stone and has a slate roof.  The library has  one storey, a front of three gables with ball finials, a central porch with an arcaded parapet, an elliptical-headed doorway, and mullioned and transomed windows with elliptical heads and hood moulds.  The museum and art gallery have two storeys, a four-bay central block, a three-bay gabled block to the right, and a diagonally-set gabled block to the left.  On the gables are panels of carved figures.

See also

Listed buildings in Rochdale

References

External links

 

Buildings and structures in Rochdale
Museums in Greater Manchester
Art museums and galleries in Greater Manchester
Tourist attractions in the Metropolitan Borough of Rochdale